Sergei Davydov may refer to:

Sergei Davydov (figure skater) (born 1979), Belarusian figure skater
 Sergei Sergeyevich Davydov (born 1985), Russian footballer
 Sergei Yuryevich Davydov (born 1979), Russian footballer
 Serhiy Davydov (born 1984), Ukrainian footballer

See also
Davydov (surname)